Big is the second single to be taken from Australian dance-duo Sneaky Sound System.

Release and promotion
The music video for Big was released to the band's YouTube channel on September 12, 2011, and was shot in Las Vegas. The track has been described as "a soaring, majestic pop song with undeniable magic".

The track was performed on popular breakfast show Sunrise.

Track listing
Digital Single
 Big

Digital EP
 Big
 Big (John Dahlback remix)
 Big (Oliver remix)
 Big (Goodwill & Black Angus remix)
 Always By Your Side (Nicolas Jaar 'Big' version)

Charts

References

2011 singles
Sneaky Sound System songs
2011 songs
Songs written by Connie Mitchell